Fanny Hardwick (12 January 1875 – 2 June 1901) was a young woman who was murdered in Rockhampton, Queensland by her former partner, Portuguese wharf labourer John Rheubens on the evening of 2 June 1901.

Murder
The murder took place in a boarding house in one of six cottages located next to the Terminus Hotel, known as Carpenter's Cottages, owned by local identity Edwin Robert Carpenter. Hardwick had moved into the boarding house with her three-year-old son and her mother upon leaving Rheubens, after which she commenced a relationship with a Sinhalese cook called Charlie Price, which prompted Rheubens to become jealous.  Rheubens desperately attempted to convince Hardwick to re-commence their relationship, during which time Rheubens allegedly assaulted Price on two separate occasions.

On the evening of 2 June 1901, Rheubens attempted to visit Hardwick but following another of Hardwick's rejections, he went away and returned with a tomahawk. Following a struggle, Rheubens produced a sheath knife and stabbed Hardwick in the chest before leaving the scene.

Within an hour, police located Rheubens at his home where he was arrested in a violent struggle. After being taken back to the watchhouse, police discovered Rheubens was suffering from a head injury.  After a medical examination, Rheubens was transported to Rockhampton Hospital under police escort.  He was admitted to hospital where he stayed under police guard.

Hardwick's body was buried in the South Rockhampton Cemetery on 3 June 1901.

Suicide attempt
In the early hours of 8 June 1901, Rheubens attempted to commit suicide in hospital after distracting the police constables who were guarding him. He snatched a knife intending to cut his own throat.  The constables managed to restrain him with Rheubens failing to cause himself any life-threatening injuries.

Trial
Rheubens' murder trial commenced in the Rockhampton Supreme Court before Justice Virgil Power on 26 August 1901. Rheubens pleaded not guilty, and consistently maintained he had very little memory of the night in question.

On 27 August 1901, a jury found Rheubens guilty of wilful murder.  Judge Power said he agreed with the jury's verdict, and that he could only pass one sentence and proceeded to sentence Rheubens to be "hanged by the neck until you are dead".

Execution
Rheubens' death sentence was met with some opposition in the Rockhampton community.  A petition was circulated in an attempt to prevent Rheubens from being hanged which drew considerable support, eventually gaining almost 1,300 signatures.  After the petition was presented to the Executive Council, the council rejected it and allowed the execution to go ahead as planned.

In a letter addressed to the secretary of the Rockhampton Waterside Workers' Union dated 18 September 1901, Rheubens thanked all who had signed the petition and advised the secretary to publish a notice of thanks in The Morning Bulletin.

Rheubens was hanged at Boggo Road Gaol in Brisbane on 30 September 1901.

Prior to Rheubens' execution, the Commissioner of Police, William Parry-Okeden announced a constable who worked on the murder investigation had received a promotion and a reward for his services.

Hardwick's murder and Rheubens' trial and execution attracted attention from the national press.

Notes

References 

1901 murders in Australia
Female murder victims
Rockhampton
Deaths by stabbing in Australia
Murder in Queensland
1900s in Queensland